Vladimir Fedotov may refer to:

 Vladimir Fedotov (1943–2009), Russian football manager and former football player
 Vladimir Fedotov (footballer, born 1966), Russian football manager and former football player